The 1995–96 season saw Rochdale compete in their 22nd consecutive season in the fourth tier of the English football league, named at the time as the Football League Third Division.

Statistics
																											
																												

|}

Final League Table

Competitions

Football League Third Division

F.A. Cup

Football League Cup (Coca Cola Cup)

Football League Trophy (Auto Windscreens Shield)

Lancashire Cup

References

Rochdale A.F.C. seasons
Rochdale